Bibb may refer to:

Places in the United States
 Bibb County, Alabama
 Fort Bibb, Alabama, constructed in 1818
 Bibb City, Georgia, in Muscogee County
 Bibb County, Georgia

People
 Bibb (surname)
 Bibb (given name)

Ships
 , a Revenue Marine cutter transferred to the United States Coast Survey in 1847
 , a Coast Survey vessel, sometimes considered to be the same vessel as the first Bibb
 , a Coast Guard cutter commissioned 10 March 1937

Other uses
 bibb, bibcock, hose bib
 Bibb, a variety of butterhead lettuce
 Bibb Correctional Facility, a state men's prison in Brent, Alabama
 Bibb County High School, Centreville, Alabama
 Bibb Manufacturing Company, a defunct American textile company

English-language masculine given names